Francesco Teodoro Arese Lucini (Milan, 30 January 1778 – Milan, 30 April 1835) was a prominent member of the Milanese resistance to the Austrian Empire, early proponent of Italian unification, and member of the House of Arese. 

He was held in the Špilberk Castle and sentenced to death (later commuted) by Francis I, Emperor of Austria for his former alliance with Eugène de Beauharnais, Viceroy of the Napoleonic Kingdom of Italy, and for conspiring to liberate Lombardy and unite it with Piedmont.

Gallery

References 

Italian unification
1778 births
1835 deaths